John T. Schuessler is an American businessman, the former chairman, CEO and president of the fast food chain Wendy's International, Inc. He started with the company in 1976 and retired in 2006.

Employment history 
 Wendy's International
 1973 worked at McDonalds
 1976: hired as manager trainee in Atlanta, Georgia
 1983-1984: regional VP, company operations
 1984-1986: zone VP
 1986-1987: division VP
 1987: promoted to executive VP, Northwest Region
 1995: promoted to executive VP, U.S. operations
 2000: named CEO and president, March 16, 2000
 2001: named chairman of the board, May 1, 2000
 2006: retired

Education 
 Prep school at St. Louis University High.
 BS from Spring Hill College, Mobile, Alabama

External links
 Forbes.com "John Schuessler Profile"

Year of birth missing (living people)
Living people
Spring Hill College alumni
American chief executives of food industry companies